Polygnotus  ( Polygnotos) was an ancient Greek painter from the middle of the 5th century BC.

Life
He was the son and pupil of Aglaophon. He was a native of Thasos, but was adopted by the Athenians, and admitted to their citizenship.

During the time of Cimon, Polygnotus painted for the Athenians a picture of the taking of Troy on the walls of the Stoa Poikile, and another of the marriage of the daughters of Leucippus in the Anacaeum. Plutarch mentions that historians and the poet Melanthius attest that Polygnotus did not paint for the money but rather out of a charitable feeling towards the Athenian people. In the hall at the entrance to the Acropolis other works of his were preserved. The most important of his paintings were his frescoes in the Lesche of the Knidians, a building erected at Delphi by the people of Cnidus. The subjects of these were the visit to Hades by Odysseus and the taking of Troy.

The traveller Pausanias recorded a careful description of these paintings, figure by figure. The foundations of the building have been recovered in the course of the French excavations at Delphi. From this evidence, some archaeologists have tried to reconstruct the paintings, other than their colours. The figures were detached and seldom overlapping, ranged in two or three rows one above another; and the farther were not smaller nor dimmer than the nearer. Therefore, it seems that the paintings of this time were executed on almost precisely the same plan as contemporary sculptural reliefs.

Polygnotus employed only a few simple colours. Technically his art was primitive. His excellence lay in the beauty of his drawing of individual figures, especially in the "ethical" and ideal character of his art. A contemporary and perhaps teacher of Pheidias, Polygnotus had the same grand manner. Simplicity, which was almost childlike, sentiment at once noble and gentle, extreme grace and charm of execution, marked his works, in contrast to the more animated, complicated and technically superior paintings of later ages.

References

Citations

Bibliography

Pausanias, Description of Greece. W. H. S. Jones (translator). Loeb Classical Library. Cambridge, MA: Harvard University Press; London, William Heinemann Ltd. (1918).

Ancient Greek painters
Artists of ancient Thasos
5th-century BC Greek people
Metics in Classical Athens
5th-century BC painters